Pieter Pietersz Barbiers (also Pieter Barbiers Pzn., or Pieter Barbiers II, bapt. October 26, 1749, Amsterdam - October 26, 1842, Amsterdam) was a 19th-century painter from the Northern Netherlands.

Biography

According to the RKD he was the son of Pieter Barbiers (1717-1780) and the brother of Bartholomeus Barbiers.
He became a member of the Amsterdam Guild of St. Luke in 1786, but the group dissolved in 1796 when the guilds were abolished during the French occupation. He became a member of the Royal Academy of Amsterdam in 1822.
His pupils were his nephew Bartholomeus Barbiers the younger, and the following students at the academy: Carel Lodewijk Hansen, Jan Hulswit (painter), Johannes Jelgerhuis, Daniël Kerkhoff, Johannes Hendrik Knoop, Thomas van Leent, Jacobus Pelgrom, Petrus Antonius Ravelli, Abraham Johannes Ruytenschildt, Johan Christiaan Willem Safft, Barend Hendrik Thier, Pier Johannes de Visser,  and Henricus Franciscus Wiertz.
He left fine landscapes, often representing the environs of Geldern and Haarlem.

References

Pieter Barbiers on Artnet

1749 births
1842 deaths
19th-century Dutch painters
Dutch male painters
Painters from Amsterdam
19th-century Dutch male artists